The Unreleased Themes for Hellraiser (subtitled The Consequences of Raising Hell) was the fourth album that Coil released in 1987. The album was released on CD, cassette and 10" vinyl. It was the proposed soundtrack to the film Hellraiser, but was turned down because it was not considered commercial enough.

Background
A-side tracks from the 10"/cassette version and all tracks from the CD version later appeared on the Unnatural History II compilation. B-side tracks from the 10"/cassette version later appeared as a single track on Unnatural History III.

This is one of very few releases on the record label Solar Lodge (another being Crime's "San Francisco's Doomed" CD, a collaboration with Overground records), with catalog number COIL 1. The cassette version was licensed to Soleilmoon and released in 1990, with catalog number SOL 4. The cassette features a different cover than the CD and vinyl release.

Track listing

10" vinyl and cassette versions
Side A: "The Unreleased Themes for Hellraiser"
 "Hellraiser" – 2:46
 "Box Theme" – 3:01
 "Main Title" – 3:14
Side B: "Music for Commercials"
 "Airline 1" – 0:41
 "Liqueur" – 0:43
 "Perfume" – 0:31
 "Video Recorder" – 0:30
 "Airline 2" – 0:46
 "Natural Gas" – 0:46
 "Cosmetic 1" – 0:17
 "Cosmetic 2" – 0:15
 "Analgesic" – 1:13
 "Road Surface" – 1:23
 "Accident Insurance" – 1:35

CD version
 "Hellraiser Themes" – 2:45
 "The Hellbound Heart" – 2:19
 "Box Theme" – 3:02
 "No New World" – 3:53
 "Attack of the Sennapods" – 1:51
 "Main Title" – 3:12

References

External links
 
 
 The Unreleased Themes for Hellraiser at Brainwashed

1987 EPs
Coil (band) EPs